Lipid phosphate phosphohydrolase 3 (LPP3), also known as phospholipid phosphatase 3 (PLPP3) and phosphatidic acid phosphatase type 2B (PAP-2b or PPAP2B), is an enzyme that in humans is encoded by the PPAP2B gene on chromosome 1. It is ubiquitously expressed in many tissues and cell types. LPP3 is a cell-surface glycoprotein that hydrolyzes extracellular lysophosphatidic acid (LPA) and short-chain phosphatidic acid. Its function allows it to regulate vascular and embryonic development by inhibiting LPA signaling, which is associated with a wide range of human diseases, including cardiovascular disease and cancer, as well as developmental defects. The PPAP2B gene also contains one of 27 loci associated with increased risk of coronary artery disease.

Structure

Gene 
The PPAP2B gene resides on chromosome 1 at the band 1p32.2 and includes 6 exons.

Protein 
LPP3 is a member of the PAP-related phosphoesterase family. It is a type 2 activity PAP, which localizes to the plasma membrane, and is one of four known LPP isoforms. As an integral membrane protein, LPP3 contains six hydrophobic transmembrane domains and a hydrophilic catalytic site composed of three conserved domains. One catalytic domain is proposed to bind the substrate while the other two contribute to dephosphorylation of the substrate. The catalytic site typically faces the extracellular matrix when located on the cell membrane and faces the lumen when located in intracellular membranes. This protein can form homo- and hetero-oligomers.

Function 

This protein is a membrane glycoprotein localized at the cell plasma membrane. It has been shown to actively hydrolyze extracellular lysophosphatidic acid (LPA) and short-chain phosphatidic acid. [5] As an LPA inhibitor, PPAP2B is known to suppress LPA receptor mediated cellular signaling, which is associated with activation of vascular and blood cells and epithelial cell migration and proliferation. In response to dynamic atherorelevant-flows, PPAP2B can promote anti-inflammatory phenotype via inhibition of LPA signaling and maintain vascular integrity of endothelial monolayer. This flow-sensitive PPAP2B expression is inhibited by microRNA-92a and activated by transcription factor KLF2. In addition to LPA receptor-mediated signaling, PPAP2B is also associated with Wnt signaling, functioning in embryonic development for proper formation of important tissues including bone, heart and muscle. The phenotype of axis duplication in mice globally lacking PPAP2B resembles that observed in animals with altered Wnt signaling. Furthermore, Wnt signaling mediated TCF/LEF-transcription via β-catenin is upregulated in PPAP2B null embryonic stem cells, implicating LPP3 as a negative regulator of the Wnt pathway.

Clinical Significance 
Due to the regulatory role of LPP3 in vascular and embryonic development, inactivation of this protein can contribute to cardiovascular disease and developmental complications. For example, inducible inactivation of LPP3 in both endothelial and hematopoietic cells leads to atherosclerosis due to accumulation of LPA in human plaques. Likewise, plasma LPA levels are significantly elevated in patients with acute coronary syndromes.  It was further observed that reduced levels of endothelial LPP3 is associated with disturbed flow and mechano-regulation in blood vessels. During embryonic development in mice, inactivation of LPP3 results in early lethality in part due to failure of extra-embryonic vascular development. Abnormal activation of LPA signaling has also been implicated in cancer, fibrotic disorders, and metabolic syndrome (involving insulin resistance).

Clinical Marker 
In humans, PPAP2B emerged as 1 of 13 new loci associated with coronary artery disease by genome-wide association studies (GWAS). This prediction appears to be independent of traditional risk factors for cardiovascular disease such as high cholesterol levels, high blood pressure, obesity, smoking, and diabetes mellitus.

Additionally, a multi-locus genetic risk score study, based on a combination of 27 loci including the PPAP2B gene, identified individuals at increased risk for both incident and recurrent coronary artery disease events, as well as an enhanced clinical benefit from statin therapy. The study was based on  a community cohort study (the Malmo Diet and Cancer study) and four additional randomized controlled trials of primary prevention cohorts (JUPITER and ASCOT) and secondary prevention cohorts (CARE and PROVE IT-TIMI 22).

Taken together, these findings also suggest that PPAP2B and LPA may serve a role in predicting and screening coronary artery disease for early prevention.

Interactions

Interactive Pathway Map 

LPP3 participates in interactions within the triacylglyceride synthesis and sphingolipid metabolism pathways.

References

Further reading